The Montenegrin alphabet is the collective name given to "Abeceda" (Montenegrin Latin alphabet) and "Азбука" (Montenegrin Cyrillic alphabet), the writing systems used to write the Montenegrin language. It was adopted on 9 June 2009 by the Montenegrin Minister of Education, Sreten Škuletić and replaced the Serbian Cyrillic and Gaj's Latin alphabets in use at the time.

Although the Latin and Cyrillic alphabets enjoy equal status under the Constitution of Montenegro, the government and proponents of the Montenegrin language prefer to use the Latin script; it is also much more widely used in all aspects of the day-to-day written communication in the country, in education, advertising and media.

History

Efforts to create a Latin character-based Montenegrin alphabet go back to at least World War I, when a newspaper was published in Cetinje using both Latin and Cyrillic characters.

Latin alphabet

The Montenegrin Latin alphabet (Montenegrin: crnogorska latinica / црногорска латиница, crnogorska abeceda / црногорска абецеда or crnogorski alfabet / црногорски алфабет)  is used for writing the Montenegrin language in Latin script.

 Abeceda: A B C Č Ć D Dž Đ E F G H I J K L Lj M N Nj O P R S Š Ś T U V Z Ž Ź

It uses most letters of the ISO basic Latin alphabet, with the exception of Q, W, X and Y, only used for writing common words or proper names directly borrowed  from foreign languages.

Montenegrin Latin is based on Gaj's Latin alphabet, with the addition of the two letters Ś and Ź, to replace the pairs SJ and ZJ (so anachronistically considered as digraphs). These parallel the two letters of the Montenegrin Cyrillic alphabet not found in Serbian, С́ and З́, and could also be represented in the original alphabets as sj and zj, and сj and зj, respectively. Because these two glyphs already exist in the Polish alphabet, but must be created in Cyrillic by using combining characters, it provides an additional incentive to prefer Latin over Cyrillic.

It also uses some Latin extended letters, composed with a basic Latin letter and one of two combining accents (the acute accent or caron, over C, S, and Z), and a supplementary base consonant Đ: they are needed to note additional phonetic distinctions (notably to preserve the distinctions that are present in the Cyrillic script with which the Montenegrin language has also long been written, when it was still unified in the former Yugoslavia within the written Serbo-Croatian language).

Digraphs
The alphabet also includes some digraphs built from the previous characters (that are considered as single letters for collation purpose): Dž, Nj, and Lj.

Cyrillic alphabet

The Montenegrin Cyrillic alphabet ( /  or  / ) is the official Cyrillic script of the Montenegrin language. It is used in parallel with the Latin script. It is a child system of Serbian Cyrillic.

 Azbuka: А Б В Г Д Ђ Е Ж З З́ И Ј К Л Љ М Н Њ О П Р С С́ Т Ћ У Ф Х Ц Ч Џ Ш

Its first version was developed by Vojislav Nikčević in the 1970s who was a dissident of the Socialist Federal Republic of Yugoslavia and considered Montenegrin speech to be unique and deserving of consideration as a separate language from Serbo-Croatian.

The modern version was brought into official use in early 2009 by the Ministry of Education under Sreten Škuletić. It was called the First Montenegrin Orthography, included a new Orthographic Dictionary, and replaced the Serbian Cyrillic script which was official until then. The act is a component part of the process of standardisation of the Montenegrin language, starting in mid-2008 after the adoption of Montenegrin as the official language of Montenegro.

References

alphabet
Latin alphabets
Cyrillic alphabets
2009 introductions
2009 establishments in Montenegro